Nooksack Valley High School is a four-year public secondary school located in rural Whatcom County, just north of Nooksack. It is located just north of Nooksack, Washington, on E. Badger Road at the junction of State Route 9 and State Route 546.  The school mascot is a Pioneer and the school colors are purple and white.

Notable alumni
Joe Cipriano - college basketball head coach, University of Idaho and Nebraska; led Washington to 1953 Final Four as a player; class of 1949
Tom Ackerman - center, New Orleans Saints (1996-2001), Tennessee Titans (2002-2003)
T. J. Ackerman - tackle, Toronto Argonauts

References

External links 
  - Nooksack Valley High School
 OSPI school report card

High schools in Whatcom County, Washington
Public high schools in Washington (state)